Bus services in Prague are provided by a number of transport operators, the chief of which is Dopravní podnik hlavního města Prahy, a.s. (the Prague Capital City Transport Company). Almost all city and suburban buses (as well as the city's metro and tramway lines, the Vltava ferries, and a funicular railway) are run as part of the Pražská integrovaná doprava (PID – Prague Integrated Transport) network, under the management of the regional organizing agency ROPID.

History
The first buses in Prague were operated experimentally in 1908 in the Malá Strana district, but the unreliable technology at the time led to the trial service being declared a failure after 20 months. Regular services did not begin again until 20 June 1925, but have been in continuous operation ever since that date.

In the 1990s and 2000s, the metropolitan system was expanded and integrated with suburban transport as Prague Integrated Transport (PID), although a few areas remain outside this system.

Buses fulfil many different roles in Prague's public transport system. Many lines serve as connections between the metro, tram, and rail systems and outlying residential areas. There are also plans to gradually introduce trunk services, similar to Latin America's bus rapid transit systems.

Main terminals of metropolitan buses are near metro stations: Černý Most, Zličín, Háje, Letňany, Nové Butovice, Želivského, Českomoravská, Kačerov, Budějovická, Depo Hostivař, Dejvická, Na Knížecí (Anděl), Skalka, Palmovka, Nádraží Holešovice, Florenc etc. Some suburban and long-distance buses stop at these stations.

Since 2008, ROPID is implementing a plan to differentiate rachial lines with small intervals and articulated buses. Some telematic systems are widely implemented (GPS monitoring, traffic signal preference).

From 2016 the buses in Prague have an average speed of 25,3 km/h.

Route numbers

Bus lines belonging to the PID system are numbered within number series: 
 100-250: daytime city routes (for technical reasons, route 100 is operationally numbered internally as route 299)
 251-275: school routes
 300-398: daytime suburban routes
 421-499 and 601-671: daytime regional routes (outside the city centre)
 901-915: nighttime city routes
 951-960: nighttime suburban routes
 special bus routes for disabled persons: marked with a wheelchair symbol and the numbers 1, 2, 3 (also H1, formerly H2 and H3, internally numbered as 799 (H1), 798 (H3) and 797 (H2).
 letter X with number of tram line (X-9, X22) or metro line letter (X-A, XC) are used for occasional substitute lines. Internally numbered in the 800 series (809, 822...). Some substitute lines are numbered in 700 series.
 AE: Airport Express (internally 790)
 700 series: some temporary local lines with non-standard financing (financed not by the city itself but by city districts etc.)

Outside the PID system:
 700 series: special lines (transport to trade fairs, football matches etc.)
 shopping lines: marked in different ways (logos, letters, shop names etc. – IKEA, IKEA2, GLOBUS, OCL, T, E, S, C, O, BBC, OUTLET), all free of charge
 ZOO line with symbolic fare
 suburban lines of SID (Central Bohemian Integrated Transport) organized by Central Bohemian Region. Several attempts to integrate PID and SID are so far unsuccessful. Marked with combinations of one letter and two digits, e. g. D97.
 other lines outside integrated systems, mostly intercity and long-distance public lines, with small importance to city transport
 non-public (special) lines (for workers, handicapped etc.)

Operators 

 Dopravní podnik hl. m. Prahy a. s. (DPP), most of metropolitan PID lines and several tens of suburban PID lines. DPP has 5 big bus depots in Prague: Klíčov (Prosek), Vršovice (Michle), Kačerov (Michle), Hostivař (Malešice), Řepy (Řepy)
 Arriva Transport Česká republika, a. s.: ca 9 metropolitan PID lines and 50 suburban PID lines, some SID lines and non-integrated lines. The main bus depot is in Vršovice.
 ČSAD Střední Čechy, a. s.: 31 suburban PID lines
 ČSAD POLKOST, spol. s r. o.: metropolitan PID line No. 232 and 11 suburban PID lines
 ČSAD MHD Kladno, a. s.: 9 suburban PID lines and several suburban SID lines
 Martin Uher, spol. s r. o.: 6 suburban PID lines
 STENBUS s. r. o.: metropolitan lines 269, 263, 206, 562, 564
 ABOUT ME s. r. o.: minibus metropolitan lines 295, 296, 297, H2
 Jaroslav Štěpánek: metropolitan PID lines 110 and 557, suburban PID line 302
 PROBO BUS a. s. (Abellio Group):  5 suburban PID lines
 Okresní autobusová doprava Kolín, s. r. o.: 2 suburban lines to Prague (and 14 regional lines PID in Kolín District)
 Hotliner s. r. o. and Cityliner s. r. o.: some shopping lines outside PID and some occasional tram-substitute lines
 Libor Valenta: several shopping lines of Tesco Letňany (outside PID)
 CEDAZ s. r. o.: shuttle microbuses to the airport, outside PID
 ČSAD Benešov a. s.: shopping line OUTLET Štěrboholy, outside PID
 many other operators of SID system and non-integrated suburban and long-distance lines

References

Bus transport in the Czech Republic
Public transport in Prague